The current coat of arms of Guatemala was adopted after the  by a decree of president Miguel García Granados. It consists of multiple symbols representing liberty and sovereignty on a bleu celeste shield. According to government specifications, the coat of arms should be depicted without the shield only when on the flag, but the version lacking the shield (→national emblem) is often used counter to these regulations.

History
In 1871, for the 50th anniversary of Guatemala gaining independence, president Miguel García Granados asked the mint to produce a design to commemorate the event. The Swiss engraver Juan Bautista Frener designed the shield, and Granados decided to adopt it as the national coat of arms, abandoning the previous coat of arms which had conservative symbolism. In Executive Decree No. 33 of 18 November, the coat of arms was described: 
The arms of the republic will be: a shield with two rifles and two swords crossed with a wreath of laurel on a field of light blue. The middle will harbor a scroll of parchment with the words "Liberty 15 of September of 1821" in gold and in the upper part a Quetzal as the symbol of national independence and autonomy. 
The flag and coat of arms were further regulated in detail in a 12 September 1968 decree by the government of president Julio César Méndez Montenegro, specifying the elements, colors, and the specific shade of blue on the shield.

Symbolism
The elements of the coat of arms have the following symbolism:
The Resplendent quetzal is the national bird of Guatemala, and represents freedom and independence of the nation.
The crossed Remington rifles are the type used during the 1871 Liberal Revolution, and represent the will to defend Guatemala's interests.
The crossed swords represent justice and honor.
The laurel wreath represents victory.
The parchment at the center reads "Liberty 15 of September of 1821", the date Guatemala gained independence from Spain.

Historical coats of arms

References

Guatemala
National symbols of Guatemala
Guatemala
Guatemala
Guatemala
Guatemala